Space Chimps 2: Zartog Strikes Back is a 2010 American 3D computer-animated science fiction comedy film directed and produced by John H. Williams and written by Rob Moreland. It is the sequel to Space Chimps (2008). Zack Shada, Carlos Alazraqui, Cheryl Hines, Patrick Warburton, Stanley Tucci, Patrick Breen, Omid Abtahi and Jane Lynch reprise their roles from the previous film; Andy Samberg, Jeff Daniels, and Kristin Chenoweth were replaced by Tom Kenny, John DiMaggio, and Laura Bailey, respectively. Space Chimps 2 was theatrically released in the United Kingdom on May 28, 2010. 20th Century Fox Home Entertainment released it direct-to-video in the United States on October 5, 2010. It was universally panned by critics.

Plot 
Two years after the events of the first film, Comet (Zack Shada), a tech-savvy young chimpanzee, wants to be taken seriously as a full-fledged space chimp, but Ham (Tom Kenny), Luna (Cheryl Hines) and the other chimpanzees do not take him seriously. Comet learns that he was removed from the last space mission because of budget cuts, and plans to go on the next space mission. Comet interferes with the controls on a rocket, accidentally launching the ship into space. Eventually, Comet lands on Planet Malgor, where he meets Ham’s alien friend, Kilowatt (Laura Bailey), for the first time, and gains respect from the residents there.

However, back on Earth, Zartog (John DiMaggio) wants to get revenge on Ham for foiling his plans, and encounters an oblivious Titan (Patrick Warburton), who gives him a tour of NASA headquarters. Zartog takes over Mission Control using a remote that vaporizes objects and zaps the Senator (Stanley Tucci) and the three scientists, Dr. Bob (Patrick Breen), Dr. Jagu (Omid Abtahi) and Dr. Poole (Jane Lynch) out of existence.  Comet, accompanied by Kilowatt, returns to Earth, while Ham evades Zartog by riding on a jetpack. While Zartog is distracted, Comet manages to steal the remote and reprograms it to bring the Senator and the scientists back, and shrink Zartog; Zartog escapes while the others laugh. The film ends with Zartog running from a dog he harassed earlier and a Guinea pig from the Mars mission, mentioned in the prior film.

Cast
 Zack Shada as Comet
 Laura Bailey as Kilowatt, Computer Voice, Instar Receptionist, Girl Reporter
 Carlos Alazraqui as Houston, Piddles the Clown, Camera Guy
 Tom Kenny as Ham III, Reporter #1
 Cheryl Hines as Luna
 Patrick Warburton as Titan
 John DiMaggio as Zartog
 Stanley Tucci as Senator
 Patrick Breen as Dr. Bob
 Omid Abtahi as Dr. Jagu, Reporter #2
 Jane Lynch as Dr. Poole

Release
Entertainment Film Distributors released the film to cinemas in the United Kingdom on May 28, 2010, and 20th Century Fox released it in the United States on October 5, 2010. Space Chimps 2 grossed $4.3 million.

Space Chimps 2: Zartog Strikes Back is the second Vanguard Animation film that was a sequel. The film was released on DVD on September 27, 2010, in 3D, along with the double feature pack, with both films, in the United Kingdom. The film originally opened on #7, in the United Kingdom, on the release weekend.

Reception
The film has a rating of 0% on review aggregator Rotten Tomatoes based on 8 reviews and an average rating of 2.3/10.

References

External links

Space Chimps
2010 films
3D films
2010 3D films
2010s American animated films
2010 computer-animated films
Animated films about apes
Animated films about revenge
2010s children's animated films
Direct-to-video sequel films
Vanguard Animation
20th Century Fox direct-to-video films
20th Century Fox animated films
American children's animated space adventure films
American children's animated comic science fiction films
Films set on fictional planets
2010s children's adventure films
2010s English-language films
2010s American films